
Christina Perozzi and Hallie Beaune are a pair of authors, who together maintain the website TheBeerChicks.com (originally called "Beer for Chicks", where they cover beer and alcohol related topics

In 2009 Perozzi was named "Best Beer Sommelier" by Los Angeles magazine and in 2012 Perozzi and Beaune published The Naked Pint: An Unadulterated Guide to Craft Beer and hosted the Cooking Channel special Eat This, Drink That.

The two met while working together at Father's Office, a pub in Santa Monica.

Bibliography
The Naked Pint: An Unadulterated Guide to Craft Beer (2009)
The Naked Brewer: Fearless Homebrewing, Tips, Tricks & Rule-Breaking Recipes (2012)

References

Further reading
 Alderton, Bryce (August 9, 2011). "Beer Chicks Branch Out With Retail Shop; Beer Crawl On Tap". Los Angeles Magazine. Accessed May 31, 2014.

External links 
 
 Official website for The Naked Pint
 Christina Perozzi

Living people
American food writers
Year of birth missing (living people)
Beer writers
Writing duos